Skander Cheikh (born 8 January 1987) is a Tunisian football midfielder.

References

1987 births
Living people
Tunisian footballers
Tunisia international footballers
Espérance Sportive de Tunis players
JS Kairouan players
Club Africain players
Grombalia Sports players
EGS Gafsa players
ES Métlaoui players
Association football midfielders
Tunisian Ligue Professionnelle 1 players
People from Nabeul Governorate